Betsy is a feminine given name.

Betsy may also refer to:


Places in the United States
 Betsy Branch, a stream in Missouri
 Betsy Hollow, a valley in Missouri
 Betsy Lake (Luce County, Michigan)

Music
Betsy, a band name used by Bitch (band) for one album in 1988
Betsy (singer) (2000), Welsh singer
Betsy, solo name of Betsy Weiss, lead singer of Bitch (band)
Betsy, solo name of Betsy Smittle, half-sister of Garth Brooks
Betsy (Bitch album), 1988
Betsy (Betsy album), 2017

Other uses
Kevin Betsy (born 1978), English football coach and former player
The Betsy, a novel by Harold Robbins
The Betsy, a 1978 film by Daniel Petrie based on the novel
Tropical Storm Betsy (disambiguation), various hurricanes and tropical cyclones

See also
 Big Betsy River and Little Betsy River, both in Michigan
Betsey (disambiguation)